Amblyseius monacus is a species of mite in the family Phytoseiidae.

References

monacus
Articles created by Qbugbot
Animals described in 1975